Susan Mugabi Nakaziba is an Ugandan politician from the NUP who represents Buvuma District in the Parliament of Uganda.

In 2021 she protested against harassment of fishing communities.

See also 

 List of members of the eleventh Parliament of Uganda

References 

Living people
Year of birth missing (living people)
Members of the Parliament of Uganda
Women members of the Parliament of Uganda
National Unity Platform politicians
21st-century Ugandan women politicians
21st-century Ugandan politicians
People from Buvuma District